The 2015 Duo BRDC Formula 4 Autumn Trophy was a two-event motor racing championship for open wheel, formula racing cars held across England, as an off-season trophy to the BRDC Formula 4 Championship. The trophy featured a mix of professional motor racing teams and privately funded drivers, and also featured the debut of the new 2-litre 230-bhp Tatuus-Cosworth single seat race car that will be used from the 2016 BRDC Formula 4 Championship season onwards. The season was run at Snetterton 300 on November 7–8 and at Brands Hatch Indy on November 14–15, in two quadruple-header events.

The Autumn Trophy Champion will receive free entry for the entire 2016 main season, a prize with a monetary value of over £5,000. The runner-up in the championship will be rewarded with 50 per cent off their entry fees for next year, with the third placed overall driver receiving a discount of 25 per cent on their respective entry fees for the 2016 season. The total value of this prize package is worth more than £10,000.

Teams and drivers
All teams were British-registered. Fortec will enter the main BRDC British F3 Championship from 2016 onwards, but made their debut in the 2015 BRDC F4 Autumn Trophy.

Race calendar and results
The race calendar consisted of two events, held on consecutive weekends, at the Snetterton 300 and at the Brands Hatch Indy, comprising a total of eight races.
The weekend format included a 20-minute qualifying session and two 20 minute races on both Saturday and Sunday. The grid for the first race in each day was set in qualifying order, with starting positions for race two of each day set by the fastest laps from race one.

Championship standings
Scoring system
Points are awarded to the top 20 classified finishers in all races.

Autumn Trophy

References

External links
 

BRDC British Formula 3 Championship seasons
BRDC Formula 4 Autumn Trophy
BRDC Formula 4 Autumn Trophy